Mallory Reaves (born 1984 to parents Michael Reaves and Brynne Chandler), is a writer from Southern California. She was initially known for her adaptations of the popular manga series After School Nightmare (nominated for a 2007 Will Eisner Award), Black Sun, Silver Moon, Her Majesty's Dog, and 07-Ghost. In addition to her work adapting manga, she assisted in editing or producing many other titles, the Go! Comi website content, and monthly newsletter.

In 2013, she co-authored The Silver Dream with Michael Reaves and Neil Gaiman. The book was a sequel to the New York Times bestseller InterWorld. The third volume, Eternity's Wheel, was released in May 2015.

Most recently, she authored the graphic novel Mirror Moon (2021), set in the universe of The Nightmare Before Christmas.

Novels
The Silver Dream (2013) – with Michael Reaves and Neil Gaiman
Eternity's Wheel (2015) – with Michael Reaves and Neil Gaiman

Manga/Graphic Novels
Belle's Tale (2017)
Mirror Moon (2021) - illustrated by Gabriella Chianello and Nataliya Torretta
The Beast's Tale (2022)

Manga adapted
07-Ghost (vols. 1-3)
After School Nightmare 
Black Sun, Silver Moon
Crossroads (vol. 4 & 5)
Her Majesty's Dog (vols. 7-11)
Night of the Beasts (vol. 2)
Tenshi Ja Nai!! (vol. 6)
Yggdrasil

Manga edited
The Devil Within
Kanna
Tenshi Ja Nai!!
A Wise Man Sleeps

Manga produced
Cantarella
Tenshi Ja Nai!!
Train+Train

Other works
In addition to her work as a writer, Mallory has dabbled in voice- and screen-acting, appearing in the anime series NieA 7 (credited as Mowi Reaves) and the Star Trek: The New Voyages episode "World Enough and Time".

References

External links

Living people
1984 births
Writers from California
American voice actresses
21st-century American women